John Lisle (1610–1664) was an English lawyer, Parliamentarian politician and Regicide.

John Lisle may also refer to:

John Lisle (died 1408)
John Lisle (died 1429)
Sir John VI Lisle

See also
John de Lisle (disambiguation)